Centerville Historic District is a national historic district located at Centerville, Wayne County, Indiana. The district encompasses 115 contributing buildings in the central business district and surrounding residential sections of Centerville. It developed between about 1817 and 1873 and includes representative examples of Greek Revival, Italianate, and Federal style architecture. During this period it was county seat of Wayne County.  Located in the district is the separately listed Oliver P. Morton House.  Other notable contributing buildings include Morton's Row, Lantz' Row, Archway row, Tarkington Homestead (c. 1830), Jacob Julian House (1857), the Mansion House (1837), the Jones House (c. 1830), and the American House (1838–39).

The district was added to the National Register of Historic Places in 1971.

References

External links

Historic American Buildings Survey in Indiana
Historic districts on the National Register of Historic Places in Indiana
Italianate architecture in Indiana
Greek Revival architecture in Indiana
Federal architecture in Indiana
Historic districts in Wayne County, Indiana
National Register of Historic Places in Wayne County, Indiana